René-Charles "Zino" Francescatti (August 9, 1902 – September 17, 1991) was a French virtuoso violinist.

Zino Francescatti was born in Marseilles, to a musical family. Both parents were violinists. His father, who also played the cello, had studied with Camillo Sivori. Zino studied violin from age three and was quickly recognized as a child prodigy. He began performing at the age of five and made his debut at age 10, playing Beethoven's Violin Concerto. 

In 1927 he went to Paris to teach at the École Normale de Musique; he also conducted the Concerts Poulets. He made his first world tour in 1931 and his American debut with Sir John Barbirolli and the New York Philharmonic in 1939, playing Paganini's Violin Concerto No. 1. His recording of the concerto is still regarded as one of the best. For three decades after 1945 he had an exceptionally impressive international career.

A violinist of outstanding technical ability, Francescatti played all of the great concerti. His performances of Mendelssohn's Violin Concerto in E minor, Saint-Saëns Violin Concerto No. 3, Bruch's Violin Concerto No. 1, and others, continue to be fondly remembered and highly regarded.

Francescatti made many renowned LPs, including a set of the complete Beethoven violin-piano sonatas with Robert Casadesus, a frequent musical collaborator of his. Both in concerts and on disc, he performed on the celebrated "Hart" Stradivarius of 1727. Upon his retirement in 1976, he sold the instrument and established the Zino Francescatti Foundation, to assist young violinists, in La Ciotat. In 1987 an international violin competition was organized in his honor in Aix-en-Provence. 

He died in La Ciotat, Bouches-du-Rhône, France, aged 89.

Quotes

"Known for his lyrical performance style and as a champion of contemporary violin music by such composers as Darius Milhaud, Leonard Bernstein, and Karol Szymanowski." - Encyclopædia Britannica

"Francescatti's playing was marked by a seemingly effortless technique, warmth of expression, and tonal elegance. "

"One of the great classical violinists of the twentieth century. Among his recordings are Saint-Saëns's famous and popular Introduction and Rondo Capriccioso, with Leonard Bernstein conducting the New York Philharmonic."

Selected recordings

 Camille Saint-Saëns, Concerto No. 3, New York Philharmonic Orchestra, conducted by Pierre Boulez (Live concert 16/12/ 1975). CD Lyrinx LYR 086
 Camille Saint-Saëns, Concerto No. 3, Philharmonic Symphony Orchestra of New York, conducted by Dimitri Mitropoulos. LP Columbia 1950 report CD Sony 1996
 Camille Saint-Saëns, Introduction et Rondo Capricioso, Havanaise; Chausson, Poème, The Philadelphia Orchestra, conducted by Eugene Ormandy. LP Columbia 1950
 Ludwig van Beethoven, Sonata in E-flat major, Op. 12 and Sonata in A minor, Op. 23 with Robert Casadesus, piano, Philips A01611R, 1961.

References

Legendary Violinists
 Roth, Henry (1997). Violin Virtuosos: From Paganini to the 21st Century. Los Angeles, CA: California Classics Books. 
 Zino Francescatti (1902-1991), le chant du violon - Charles de Couëssin-Gaëtane Prouvost, Préface de Marcel Landowski, de l’Institut, Paris, L’Harmattan, 1999.
"Zino Francescatti." BAKER'S BIOGRAPHICAL DICTIONARY OF MUSICIANS Centennial Edition. Nicolas Slonimsky, Editor Emeritus. Schirmer, 2001

Classic Archive - Zino Francescatti & Robert Casadesus (2005) 
https://web.archive.org/web/20110522134838/http://movies.yahoo.com/movie/1808630685/info

20th-century French male classical violinists
1902 births
1991 deaths
Musicians from Marseille
École Normale de Musique de Paris alumni
French people of Italian descent
Grand Cross of the Ordre national du Mérite